The Canton of Saint-Louis is a former canton in the Arrondissement of Pointe-à-Pitre in the department of Guadeloupe. It had 2,535 inhabitants (2012). It was disbanded following the French canton reorganisation which came into effect in March 2015. It comprised the commune of Saint-Louis, which joined the new canton of Marie-Galante in 2015.

See also
 Cantons of Guadeloupe
 Communes of Guadeloupe
 Arrondissements of Guadeloupe

References

Former cantons of Guadeloupe
2015 disestablishments in France
States and territories disestablished in 2015